A sexual rite of passage is a ceremonial event that marks the passage of a young person to sexual maturity and adulthood, or a widow from the married state to widowhood, and involves some form of sexual activity.

Sexual training and cleansing of pubescent females

The kusasa fumbi (Malawi) 
In some regions of Malawi (mainly Chikwawa, Nsanje, and Salima Districts) a ceremony of ritual purification known as kusasa fumbi (lit. 'brusing off the dust') is performed. In it, girls have sexual intercourse following menarche. This ceremony may also be performed after an abortion. Kusasa fumbi is also practiced in parts of Angola, Congo, Ivory Coast, Mozambique, Tanzania, Uganda, and Zambia.

Prepubescent girls (aged twelve to seventeen) are often sent to a training camp where women known as anamkungwi, 'key leaders', teach them how to cook, clean, and have sexual intercourse in order to be good wives. After the training, a man holding the traditional position of hyena (not to be confused with the animal) performs the three-day cleansing ritual for a sum of money ($4-7 per girl in 2016). Sometimes girls are required to perform the chisamba, a bare-breasted dance at the end of her initiation in front of the whole community.

The practice can place young girls at risk of HIV infection, since the hyena has sexual intercourse with all the girls without wearing condoms, as the ritual requires the exchange of sexual fluids. Traditionalist Malawians claim that the rite prevents disease; hyenas are usually selected for their good moral character and are often erroneously believed to be incapable of being infected with diseases such as HIV/AIDS, though HIV-positive men have been documented to perform the duties of a hyena.

The chinamwali (Zambia) 
The chinamwali is a three-month ritual performed in Eastern Province, Zambia. Female initiators known as alangizi teach sexual practices to girls as young as twelve. Afterwards, they are sent to an older man from the community who is 'tests' their sexual skills and decides whether they need to go back for more training. The practice is underreported, as those who undergo it are sworn to secrecy.

Sexual initiation of pre-pubescent males

Sexual initiation rites of pre-pubescent boys as young as seven is or was practiced in many cultures and usually involves sexual acts with older males, for example in the New Guinea Highlands. Among the Baruya, Etoro, and Sambia peoples, fellatio and the ingestion of semen is performed; the Kaluli practice anal sex to 'deliver' semen to the boy. These rites are often based on the belief that women represent cosmic disorder. Similar rites of ‘boy insemination’ used to be practiced by societies of indigenous Australians, in ancient Greece in Japan during the Edo (Tokugawa) period.

Sexual cleansing of widows
The sexual cleansing of widows is a tradition that requires widowed women to have sexual intercourse as a form of ritual purification. It is practiced in parts of Angola, Congo, Ivory Coast, Malawi (where it is known as kulowa kufa), Mozambique, Kenya, Uganda, and Tanzania. It has been suggested that the practice might be based on the idea that a man might die as a result of witchcraft performed by his wife.

The three- to seven-day ritual can be performed by the deceased husband's brother or other male relative, or even a sex worker. Typically, after intercourse, the widow burns her clothes and the man who had performed the purification shaves the her head. This is often done outside so that the neighborhood can witness that the widow is now cleansed. Finally, a chicken is slaughtered. 

The ritual is often forced upon a widow by the family of her deceased husband and the wider community, who may physically harm the uncompliant woman and her children. Widow cleansing was outlawed in Kenya by a 2015 bill against domestic violence.

References

Rites of passage
Superstitions of Africa
Sexuality in Africa